Events from the year 1969 in Sweden

Incumbents

National level
 Monarch – Gustaf VI Adolf
 Prime Minister – Tage Erlander until 14 October, then Olof Palme.

Events

October
 October 1
 In Sweden, Olof Palme is elected Leader of the Social Democratic Worker`s Party, replacing Tage Erlander as Prime Minister on October 14.
5 December – Swedish public television broadcaster Sveriges Radio-TV launches its second channel, TV2.

Births
 16 January — Per "Dead" Ohlin, vocalist and lyricist (died 1991).
 3 February - Paolo Roberto, boxer and actor.
 5 February - Joakim Andersson, ice hockey player.
 12 February - Anna Pernilla Torndahl, composer, artist and singer better known by her stage name Meja.
 23 March - Fredrik Nyberg, alpine skier.
 5 April - Pontus Kåmark, footballer.
 19 July - Anders Lindström, musician
 25 July — Mats Söderlund, singer better known by his stage name Günther.
 6 October - Mattias Eklundh, musician.

Deaths
 1 January — Bruno Söderström, pole vaulter and javelin thrower (born 1881)
 28 March — Kurt Petter, German physician, youth leader and educational administrator (born 1909).
 7 June — Olivia Nordgren, politician (born 1880)
 23 June - Albert Viksten, writer (born 1898).
 31 July - Harry Ahlin, film actor (born 1900).
 15 September - Åke Grönberg, film actor (born 1914).
 1 October - Gunnar Andersson, footballer (born 1928).
 16 November - Marcel Riesz, Hungarian mathematician (born 1886).

References

 
Sweden
Years of the 20th century in Sweden